Aldo Traversaro (born 26 July 1948) is a retired Italian professional boxer who was active between 1970 and 1979.

Career 
On 26 November 1977 he won the vacant European light heavyweight title (EBU) against Bunny Johnson, and defended it in 1978 against Rudy Koopmans, Francois Fiol and Avenamar Peralta. The same year he fought the WBA world title, but lost to Mike Rossman.

On 7 March 1979 Traversaro lost the EBU title to Rudy Koopmans and retired from boxing.

References

1948 births
Living people
Italian male boxers
Light-heavyweight boxers